Jakson Avelino Coelho (born 28 February 1986 in Ipatinga), commonly known as Jajá Coelho or simply Jajá, is a Brazilian football striker.

Career

Startings in Europe & Loan deals
A youth product of América-MG, Jajá Coelho arrived in Europe to sign for Dutch club Feyenoord in November 2004, but signed a loan deal with Westerlo immediately after his arrival to Rotterdam. Jajá joined Getafe CF in January 2006 after a year loan spell. After only two games for Getafe CF in 2nd half of 2005–06 season, he was loaned to Flamengo in the second half of the 2006 season, and later signed a loan deal with Racing Genk in the 2nd half of the 2006–07 season. Finally, he was loaned out to Westerlo in the 1st half of 2007–08.

Metalist Kharkiv

Jajá Coelho signed a three-and-a-half year deal for Ukrainian club FC Metalist Kharkiv in February 2008. He scored a fantastic long distance goal in an UEFA Cup match on 2 October 2008 against Besiktas J.K. from 40 metres. In 2008, he became the second foreigner that ever won the annual League MVP award established by the sport newspaper Komanda, the other one was the former captain of FC Dynamo Kyiv Valyantsin Byalkevich from Belarus.

Trabzonspor
On 7 August 2010, Jajá Coelho joined Turkish club Trabzonspor on a four-year contract for reported €4.2 million. He made his full Super Lig debut on 30 August in a 0–0 draw against Antalyaspor. Jaja scored his first goal after three league games when he scored twice in a 7–0 win against Kasımpaşa S.K. He was designated for the first time as TrabzonCell Player of the Month in November 2010. He made 29 appearances and scored 12 goals in the 2010–11 season.

Al-Ahli Dubai
On 24 June 2011, it was announced that Jajá Coelho would agree to terms on a three-year contract with UAE League giants Al-Ahli. In September the transfer was completed, for €4.5 million.

Metalist Kharkiv
On 14 January 2013, Jajá Coelho joined Ukrainian club Metalist Kharkiv for an undisclosed fee.

Kayserispor
On 12 July 2013, Jajá Coelho reached an agreement with Turkish Super Lig side Kayserispor as a 1+3 years loan. He will wear number ten in Kayserispor.

Chongqing Lifan
In February 2015, Jajá Coelho transferred to Chinese Super League side Chongqing Lifan.

Lokeren
First half season of 2015-2016 he spent in Belgium Jupiler Pro League club K.S.C. Lokeren Oost-Vlaanderen, netting 3 goals in 11 games.

Buriram United
On 14 January 2017, Jajá Coelho joined Thai club Buriram United.

Muangthong United
Jajá Coelho joined Thai club on permanent contact from Lokeren. He plays first official match as substitute in 2018 AFC Champions League play-off against Johor.

Career statistics

Club

References

External links

 
 
 Jaja Coelho at official site of Metallist Kharkiv
 Brazilian FA archive 
 Profile at VI 
 

1986 births
Living people
Brazilian footballers
Brazilian expatriate footballers
K.V.C. Westerlo players
Getafe CF footballers
CR Flamengo footballers
K.R.C. Genk players
FC Metalist Kharkiv players
Trabzonspor footballers
Al Ahli Club (Dubai) players
Sport Club Internacional players
Kayserispor footballers
Coritiba Foot Ball Club players
Chongqing Liangjiang Athletic F.C. players
K.S.C. Lokeren Oost-Vlaanderen players
Jaja Coelho
Seongnam FC players
Jaja Coelho
Chinese Super League players
Belgian Pro League players
La Liga players
Ukrainian Premier League players
Süper Lig players
Campeonato Brasileiro Série A players
K League 1 players
Association football midfielders
Sportspeople from Minas Gerais
Expatriate footballers in Ukraine
Expatriate footballers in Belgium
Expatriate footballers in Spain
Expatriate footballers in Turkey
Expatriate footballers in South Korea
Expatriate footballers in the United Arab Emirates
Expatriate footballers in China
Expatriate footballers in Thailand
Brazilian expatriate sportspeople in Ukraine
Brazilian expatriate sportspeople in Belgium
Brazilian expatriate sportspeople in Spain
Brazilian expatriate sportspeople in Turkey
Brazilian expatriate sportspeople in the United Arab Emirates
Brazilian expatriate sportspeople in China
Brazilian expatriate sportspeople in Thailand
Brazilian expatriate sportspeople in South Korea